Shenzhen Zhongqingbaowang Interaction Network Co Ltd or ZQGame is a Chinese company that makes massively multiplayer online games as well as other browser games and mobile games. Prior a subsidiary of a company that makes servers, it was listed on the Shenzhen Stock Exchange in 2010. In 2013, ZQGame announced a joint venture with Shanda located in the Shanghai Pilot Free-Trade Zone.

Some of the company's browser MMO games, including Shadowland Online, are available to play outside of China published on Kabam and Kongregate.

As at 8 November 2016, the company is the constituents of SZSE Component Index but not in SZSE 300 Index, making the company was ranked between the 301st to 500th by free float adjusted market capitalization.

ZQGame Global
ZQGame Global the global publishing subsidiary of ZQGame was founded in 2011 with headquarters in El Segundo, California, US, and offices in South Korea and Taiwan. ZQGame Global publishes mobile games for the Android and iOS mobile operating systems.

Mobile titles published by ZQGame Global

Mobile titles soon to be released

References 

Chinese companies established in 2008
Civilian-run enterprises of China
Companies based in Shenzhen
Companies listed on the Shenzhen Stock Exchange
Video game companies established in 2008
Video game companies of China
Video game development companies